Ceredo is a town in Wayne County, West Virginia, United States, situated along the Ohio River. The population was 1,450 at the 2010 census. Ceredo is a part of the Huntington-Ashland, WV-KY-OH Metropolitan Statistical Area (MSA). As of the 2000 census, the MSA had a population of 288,649.

The city is also near the location of the Southern Airways Flight 932 aviation disaster. On November 14, 1970, a McDonnell Douglas DC-9 airplane carrying the Marshall University football team crashed on a hillside on approach to the Tri-State Airport, killing all 75 on board. A movie about the tragedy, We Are Marshall, was released in 2006.

History
Ceredo was named by its founder for the bountiful harvest of corn upon the site. The name derives from Ceres, the goddess of corn and harvest.

New England Congregationalists founded Ceredo to demonstrate the superiority of an economic system not based on slave labor. Eli Thayer, an abolitionist congressman from Massachusetts, believed that bringing abolitionists like himself into southern states could ultimately bring about the end of slavery. While some welcomed the newcomers, several area newspapers published opinions against this "invasion." The newspaper of nearby Ashland, Kentucky, however, supported this move. By 1857, the city was fully established with a newspaper and several industries.

With John Brown's raid at Harpers Ferry in 1859 and the outbreak of the Civil War in 1861, the situation for this abolitionist colony appeared bleak. Its purpose to bring about the peaceful end of slavery over, several residents volunteered for pro-Union regiments.

Geography
Ceredo is located at  (38.393406, -82.560246).

Demographics

2010 census
As of the census of 2010, there were 1,450 people, 638 households, and 378 families living in the city. The racial makeup of the city was 98.2% White, 0.1% African American, 0.3% Native American, 0.1% Asian, 0.1% from other races, and 1.2% from two or more races. Hispanic or Latino of any race were 0.8% of the population.

There were 638 households, of which 20.7% had children under the age of 18 living with them, 40.9% were married couples living together, 12.4% had a female householder with no husband present, 6.0% had a male householder with no wife present, and 40.8% were non-families. 37.0% of all households were made up of individuals, and 19.6% had someone living alone who was 65 years of age or older. The average household size was 2.07 and the average family size was 2.64.

The median age in the city was 48.9 years. 16.1% of residents were under the age of 18; 10.5% were between the ages of 18 and 24; 19.1% were from 25 to 44; 27.7% were from 45 to 64; and 26.6% were 65 years of age or older. The gender makeup of the city was 42.6% male and 57.4% female.

2000 census
As of the census of 2000, there were 1,675 people, 821 households, and 466 families living in the city. The population density was 1,246.5 people per square mile (482.6/km2). There were 888 housing units at an average density of 660.8 per square mile (255.9/km2). The racial makeup of the city was 97.73% White, 0.06% Native American, 0.78% Asian, 0.12% Pacific Islander, 0.30% from other races, and 1.01% from two or more races. Hispanic or Latino of any race were 0.90% of the population.

There were 821 households, out of which 19.0% had children under the age of 18 living with them, 43.8% were married couples living together, 10.5% had a female householder with no husband present, and 43.2% were non-families. 41.0% of all households were made up of individuals, and 23.6% had someone living alone who was 65 years of age or older. The average household size was 2.01 and the average family size was 2.69.

In the city, the population was spread out, with 17.9% under the age of 18, 7.7% from 18 to 24, 22.7% from 25 to 44, 25.6% from 45 to 64, and 26.1% who were 65 years of age or older. The median age was 46 years. For every 100 females, there were 73.0 males. For every 100 females age 18 and over, there were 68.6 males.

The median income for a household in the city was $24,323, and the median income for a family was $33,700. Males had a median income of $30,735 versus $21,615 for females. The per capita income for the city was $14,733. About 10.4% of families and 15.0% of the population were below the poverty line, including 9.0% of those under age 18 and 13.6% of those age 65 or over.

Climate
The climate in this area is characterized by hot, humid summers and generally mild to cool winters.  According to the Köppen Climate Classification system, Ceredo has a humid subtropical climate, abbreviated "Cfa" on climate maps.

Notable people
 Dagmar, TV star of the 1950s lived in Ceredo in the 1990s
 Charles B. Hoard, businessman and Member of the United States House of Representatives
 Beau Smith, comic book writer, publicist, columnist
 Eli Thayer, Member of the United States House of Representatives and founder of Ceredo
 James Dixon Williams, Hollywood movie pioneer and co-founder of First National Pictures was born in Ceredo about 1877

See also
 List of cities and towns along the Ohio River

References

External links
 City website

Cities in Wayne County, West Virginia
West Virginia populated places on the Ohio River
1857 establishments in Virginia
Cities in West Virginia